David Ewan McArtney (5 April 1951 – 15 April 2013) was a New Zealand musician and songwriter. He is best known for his work with the band Hello Sailor and his band Dave McArtney & The Pink Flamingos.

In 1989, McArtney returned to university, completing his Bachelor of Arts degree in English literature, majoring in Renaissance poetry. He then went on to complete a Master of Arts (Music) degree in 2013.

He also produced for other musicians (including The Narcs) and composed music for film and television productions, including Incredible Mountains (1983), Queen City Rocker (1986) and Raglan by the Sea (1987). He worked as a tutor at the Music and Audio Institute of New Zealand (MAINZ) from 2003 until his death.

Personal life
McArtney was born in Oamaru on 5 April 1951. His family moved to Auckland and then Wellington in the early 1960s, as his father who was an accountant with ANZ Bank moved with his job. McArtney started studying law before forming Hello Sailor with Harry Lyon and Graham Brazier. He died in his home in Point Chevalier, Auckland, on 15 April 2013.

The Pink Flamingos
After Hello Sailor disbanded in 1980, McArtney formed the Pink Flamingos with Dragon keyboard player and songwriter Paul Hewson (not Bono) and a revolving line-up of players. McArtney was signed to PolyGram records and released their debut album Dave McArtney & The Pink Flamingos in 1981. Paul Hewson left the band, which then released the EP Remember The Alamo and extensively toured New Zealand. The band then relocated to Sydney and signed to Polygram Australia, releasing their second album We Never Close in 1982. Later that year the group disbanded, with McArtney moving to London. Returning to New Zealand in 1984, McArtney recorded the Pink Flamingos' third album, The Catch, released under CBS.

Discography

Albums

With Hello Sailor

Singles

Awards
 Twice nominated for the APRA Silver Scroll in 1981 and 1995.
 Five awards including Group of the Year, Album of the Year and Best Male Vocalist at the 1981 Recording Industry Awards for the album Dave McArtney and the Pink Flamingos.
 In the 1984 New Zealand Music Awards he won best producer for the Narcs single "You Took Me Heart and Soul".

Aotearoa Music Awards
The Aotearoa Music Awards (previously known as New Zealand Music Awards (NZMA)) are an annual awards night celebrating excellence in New Zealand music and have been presented annually since 1965.

! 
|-
| 2011 || Dave McArtney (as part of Hello Sailor) || New Zealand Music Hall of Fame ||  || 
|-

References

Sources
 Dix, John, Stranded in Paradise, Penguin, 2005; 
 Eggleton, David, Ready To Fly, Craig Potton, 2003; 
 Martin, Helen and Edwards, Sam, New Zealand Film 1912–1996, Oxford, 1997; 
 Spittle, Gordon, Counting The Beat, GP Publications, 1997;

Further reading

External links
Dave McArtney on Myspace
 Dave McArtney: A Glance Back Through Personal Archives at NZ Musician
   
 Dave McArtney and the Pink Flamingos blog
 Dave McArtney – RIP at NZ On Screen
 
 

1951 births
2013 deaths
APRA Award winners
New Zealand musicians
New Zealand songwriters
Male songwriters
People from Oamaru